David Wengrow (born 25 July 1972) is a British archaeologist and Professor of Comparative Archaeology at the Institute of Archaeology, University College London. He co-authored the international bestseller The Dawn of Everything: A New History of Humanity which was a finalist for the Orwell Prize in 2022. Wengrow has contributed essays on topics such as social inequality and climate change to The Guardian and The New York Times. In 2021 he was ranked No. 10 in ArtReview’s Power 100 list of the most influential people in art.

Education
Wengrow enrolled at the University of Oxford in 1993, obtaining a BA in archaeology and anthropology. He went on to qualify for an MSt in world archaeology in 1998 and then studied for a D.Phil. under the supervision of Roger Moorey completed in 2001. Andrew Sherratt was a notable influence during Wengrow's time at Oxford.

Academic career
Between 2001 and 2004 Wengrow was Henri Frankfort Fellow at the Warburg Institute and Junior Research Fellow at Christ Church, Oxford. He was appointed to a lectureship at the UCL Institute of Archaeology in 2004, and in 2011 he was made Professor of Comparative Archaeology (a post formerly held by Peter Ucko). Wengrow has conducted archaeological excavations in Africa and the Middle East, most recently with the Sulaymaniyah Museum in Iraqi Kurdistan. He is the author of three books and numerous academic articles on topics including the origins of writing, ancient art, Neolithic societies, and the emergence of the first states in Egypt and Mesopotamia. In 2020 Wengrow completed a book on the history of inequality with the anthropologist David Graeber just three weeks before Graeber's death. The Dawn of Everything: A New History of Humanity was published in the autumn of 2021.

Honours 
Wengrow is a recipient of the Antiquity Prize
and has delivered the Rostovtzeff Lectures (New York University), the Jack Goody Lectures (Max Planck Institute) the Biennial Henry Myers Lecture (Royal Anthropological Institute of Great Britain), the Radcliffe-Brown Lecture in Social Anthropology (British Academy), and the Sigmund H. Danziger Jr. Memorial Lecture in the Humanities (University of Chicago). He served as external coordinator of the Mellon Research Initiative at New York University's Institute of Fine Arts and was Distinguished Visitor at the University of Auckland.

Selected publications

Books 
 The Archaeology of Early Egypt: Social Transformations in North-East Africa, 10,000–2650 BC. Cambridge: Cambridge University Press 2006.
 What Makes Civilization?: The Ancient Near East and the Future of the West. Oxford & New York: Oxford University Press 2010.
 The Origins of Monsters: Image and Cognition in the First Age of Mechanical Reproduction. Princeton, NJ: Princeton University Press 2014.
 The Dawn of Everything: A New History of Humanity (co-authored with David Graeber). New York City: Farrar, Straus and Giroux 2021

Short essays 
 "A History of True Civilisation is Not One of Monuments". Aeon 2018.
 (co-authored with David Graeber). "How to Change the Course of Human History (At Least the Part That’s Already Happened)". Eurozine 2018. 
 "Rethinking Cities from the Ground Up". The British Academy 2019. 
 (co-authored with David Graeber). "Hiding in Plain Sight: Democracy's Indigenous Origins in the Americas". Laphams Quarterly 2020

References

External links to academic articles 
 Wengrow's articles at UCL

1972 births
Academics of the UCL Institute of Archaeology
Alumni of the University of Oxford
21st-century archaeologists
British archaeologists
Living people
Academics of the Warburg Institute
Fellows of Christ Church, Oxford
World historians